Rowshnabdar (also Romanized as Rowshnābdar) is a village in down taleqan Pain Taleqan Rural District, in the Central District of Taleqan County, Alborz Province, Iran. At the 2018 census, its population was 48, in 27 families.

References 

Populated places in Taleqan County